Azamethiphos is an organothiophosphate insecticide. It is a veterinary drug used in Atlantic salmon fish farming to control parasites. It is also used as an insecticide in biocidal products in Europe.

Mode of action 
Organophosphorus insecticides, such as Azamethiphos, inhibit the action of the enzyme acetylcholinesterase. The acetylcholine, therefore, remains intact allowing the electrical signal to proceed without interruption. This phenomenon leads to overexcitation of the organism and eventually to the death of the insect. 

Azamethiphos penetrates through the cuticle or through the cuticle opening of the insect, and also acts by ingestion and absorption through the digestive system.

Registration 
In Europe, Azamethiphos is an active substance according to the Biocide Regulation 528/2012, to be used as insecticide.

It is used in several biocidal products in Europe, as insecticide mainly for professional users. It is commonly used against flies in animal housing.

Stability 
Azamethiphos is sensitive to hydrolysis, especially at low pH.

Toxicity 
Azamethiphos is of moderate acute oral toxicity (LD50 values ranging from 834 mg kg-1 in the rat to 1764 mg kg-1 in the hamster). Acute dermal toxicity is very low (LD50 values of >2020 and >6000 mg kg-1 are reported in the rabbit and an LD50 of >2150 mg kg-1 is reported in the rat). 

Azamethiphos is irritant to eyes and skin.

Environmental toxicity 
Azamethiphos is very toxic for the environment, with a LC50 on Daphnia magna of 0.33 µg/L.

References

Organothiophosphate esters
Insecticides
Veterinary drugs